In geometry, a hippopede is a plane curve determined by an equation of the form

where it is assumed that  and  since the remaining cases either reduce to a single point or can be put into the given form with a rotation.

Special cases
When d > 0 the curve has an oval form and is often known as an oval of Booth, and when  the curve resembles a sideways figure eight, or lemniscate, and is often known as a lemniscate of Booth, after 19th-century mathematician James Booth who studied them. Hippopedes were also investigated by Proclus (for whom they are sometimes called Hippopedes of Proclus) and Eudoxus.  For , the hippopede corresponds to the lemniscate of Bernoulli.

Definition as spiric sections

Hippopedes can be defined as the curve formed by the intersection of a torus and a plane, where the plane is parallel to the axis of the torus and tangent to it on the interior circle. Thus it is a spiric section which in turn is a type of toric section.

If a circle with radius a is rotated about an axis at distance b from its center, then the equation of the resulting hippopede in polar coordinates

or in Cartesian coordinates

.

Note that when a > b the torus intersects itself, so it does not resemble the usual picture of a torus.

See also
 List of curves

References
Lawrence JD. (1972) Catalog of Special Plane Curves, Dover Publications.  Pp. 145–146.
Booth J. A Treatise on Some New Geometrical Methods, Longmans, Green, Reader, and Dyer, London, Vol. I (1873) and Vol. II (1877).

"Hippopede" at 2dcurves.com
"Courbes de Booth" at Encyclopédie des Formes Mathématiques Remarquables

External links
"The Hippopede of Proclus" at The National Curve Bank

Algebraic curves
Spiric sections